The Art Directors Guild Award for Outstanding Production Design for a Limited Series or TV Movie is an award handed out annually by the Art Directors Guild. It was introduced at the Art Directors Guilds' second annual honors, in 1998, after being combined with regular series for the first annual awards.

Winners and nominations

1990s
Excellence in Production Design Award - Television

Excellence in Production Design Award - Television Movie or Mini-Series

2000s

2010s

2020s

References

Art Directors Guild Awards
American television awards
International Alliance of Theatrical Stage Employees
Awards established in 1996